The Kentucky–Vanderbilt football rivalry is an American college football rivalry between the Kentucky Wildcats football team of the University of Kentucky and Vanderbilt Commodores football team of Vanderbilt University. They are founding members of the Southeastern Conference (SEC), and are currently members of the SEC's Eastern Division with a total of 92 meetings. This rivalry is Kentucky's second longest behind Tennessee and Vanderbilt's third behind Ole Miss and Tennessee. Kentucky leads the series 48–42–4.

39 of the 93 games have been decided by 7 points or less. Kentucky has shut out Vanderbilt 6 times, while Vanderbilt has shut out Kentucky 15 times, 10 of which were from 1896 to 1920. The rivalry is one of the most evenly matched in the SEC.

History

First game (1896)
The first game between Vanderbilt and Kentucky (then known as Kentucky State) was played in Nashville on October 10, 1896. Vanderbilt won the first game, 6–0, with Vanderbilt's captain and fullback, Connel, making a touchdown and kicking the goal after touchdown.

Early dominance by Vanderbilt
Vanderbilt dominated the series in the early years of competition. Between 1896 and 1938, the programs played 17 games. Vanderbilt won 16 of those games, the only exception being a scoreless tie in 1919.

In 1916, the dedication for Stoll Field was celebrated during the Kentucky-Vanderbilt game.

In 1921, after being shut out by Vanderbilt in 11 consecutive games, Kentucky scored two touchdowns but lost by a 21–14 score.

Kentucky's first victory (1939)
On October 7, 1939, Kentucky won its first game in the series, defeating Vanderbilt by a 21-13 score before a crowd of 10,000 in Nashville. The Wildcats were led by the passing and running of sophomore Ermal Allen. Kentucky quarterback Joe Shepherd also intercepted a Vanderbilt pass and returned it 70 yards for a touchdown.

Kentucky dominates in the Bryant years
In 1946, Bear Bryant took over as Kentucky's head football coach. In his first season, the Wildcats defeated the Commodores by a 10–7 score.  Bryant led his team to its second consecutive victory in 1947, this time by a 14–0 score. After a four-year hiatus in the rivalry from 1949 to 1952, the rivalry resumed in 1953 with Kentucky winning by a 40–14 score. Bryant left Kentucky after the 1953 season.

Collier years
Blanton Collier took over as Kentucky's head coach in 1954. He remained in that position through the 1961 season and compiled a 4–3–1 record against Vanderbilt.

Bradshaw years
Charlie Bradshaw served as Kentucky's head football coach from 1962 to 1968.  During his tenure, the Wildcats compiled a 5–1–1 against the Commodores.

Game results
Series record sources: College Football Data Warehouse.

See also  
 List of NCAA college football rivalry games

References

College football rivalries in the United States
Kentucky Wildcats football
Vanderbilt Commodores football